Bernardo "Bernie" Paz (born July 5, 1968) is a Peruvian telenovela actor. He currently resides in Miami. He is married to a Peruvian TV host-actor and has a daughter. He is currently the male lead in Azteca's 2011 telenovela, "Emperatriz" with Gabriela Spanic whom he worked with back in Telemundo's Tierra de Pasiones in 2007.

Trajectory

Television 
 Siempre tuya Acapulco (2014) .... Stefano Canciano main villain
 Quererte Así (2012) .... Gustavo Navarette Co-protagonist
 Emperatriz (2011) .... Alejandro Miranda Protagonist
 Lalola (2011) .... Ramiro "Lalo" Padilla  Special appearance
 Vidas Robadas AKA Infamia (2010) .... Joan Manuel  Villain
 Mujer Comprada AKA La Fuerza del Destino (2009/2010) .... Franco 
 Condesa por amor (2009) .... Anibal 
 Amas de Casa Desesperadas .... Carlos Solis 
 Mi adorada Malena (primera novela interactiva de Univision) .... Leonardo
 Acorralada .... Rodrigo
 Decisiones .... Manuel
 Tierra de Pasiones .... Fernando Solís  Villain, special appearance
 El pasado no perdona .... Esteban Zaldivar/Manuel Lara 
 Milagros .... Gringo Veloachaga
 Ángel Rebelde .... Claudio Salazar 
 La Hechicera Ecuador .... Andrés Bustamante
 Todo Sobre Camila .... Eduardo Bonfil  Villain
 Soledad .... Leonardo 'Leo' García
 Vidas prestadas .... Renato 'Reni' Valente López
 María Rosa, búscame una esposa .... Gonzalo
 Amor Serrano

Movies 

 Destiny Has No Favorites (2003) .... Alejandro
 El Candidato (2016) ... Mickey

References 

1968 births
Living people
Male actors from Lima
Peruvian emigrants to the United States
Peruvian male film actors
Peruvian male television actors
Peruvian male telenovela actors
21st-century Peruvian male actors